Ibrahim Qashoush (transliterated as Ibrāhīm Qāšūš; born September 3, 1977 in Hama, Syria; died July 3 or July 4, 2011 in the same place) was the victim of a murder that took place during the Syrian Civil War. Posthumously, the international media ascribed him the role of a leading author and singer of protest songs in his home city. He became a symbolic figure of the civil war as a civilian presumably murdered as revenge for his musical performances. Later media reports, however, call this account into question.

Depiction as a murdered protest singer

There are hardly any confirmed facts about Qashoush's life. Even in Hama, his name was largely unknown throughout his life. American journalist Anthony Shadid, who interviewed Hama residents about Qashoush in July 2011, reported the existence of numerous rumors in the New York Times. In various, contradictory media reports, Qashoush was described as a firefighter, a security guard, a construction worker, and a popular singer.

Qashoush was allegedly kidnapped on July 3, 2011, and was found dead in the Orontes River the following day. His throat had been cut and his vocal cords had been removed. A few days after his death, pictures began to circulate along the message that Qashoush was the alleged author and singer of the popular protest song Yalla Erhal Ya Bashar! (Arabic يلا إرحل يا بشار; translated as "Come on, Bashar, leave!"), which is directed towards President Bashar al-Assad and the ruling Arab Socialist Ba'ath Party. Since June, the song had been sung at mass demonstrations in the center of Hama, and quickly spread as a revolutionary hymn for the entire Syrian protest movement. The protest on July 1 was, at that point, the largest anti-Assad demonstration in the country.

Reactions 
After news of his murder spread and due to reports from other demonstrators, Qashoush began to be celebrated as the "nightingale of the revolution," a martyr, and a symbolic figure of the revolution both within Syria and internationally. All over the world, writers guilds, among other organizations, demonstrated against the murder of the protest singer by making public statements. The case became so prominent that, in a rare, exclusive interview in December 2011, American television journalist Barbara Walters addressed Qashoush directly with President Assad. Assad responded that he had never heard of Qashoush. Even the annual report of the U.S. Department of State on the state of human rights in Syria, published in the spring of 2012, mentioned Qashoush as a singer who was tortured and murdered by a police officer as revenge for his protest songs. As such, Qashoush also began to be discussed in academic literature.

Syrian authorities contradicted the account of Qashoush as a protest singer murdered by members of an intelligence agency, which began to spread in activist circles, and stated that he had nothing to do with the song, but rather had been working as an informant and that his murder by an unknown entity was being used to instigate further violence. In 2012, the blog The Truth About Syria referred to statements given by an oppositionist from Hama, who had confessed in prison and spoke on camera about Qashoush, among other things.

Later clarification by Abdel Rahman Farhood
In a magazine article released in the United Kingdom in 2016, exiled Syrian opposition activist Abdel Rahman Farhood confessed his identity as the real author and singer of the protest song attributed to Qashoush. According to him, in July 2011, he himself learned from the media that the singer of Yalla Erhal Ya Bashar! was found murdered. As a result, it was inadvisable for him to contradict this account, which had apparently been accepted by revolutionaries and government loyalists alike. He never knew Qashoush and, like everyone else, did not know who Qashoush was or who killed him. As early as July 2011, the New York Times portrayed Farhood as the song's writer and at least occasional singer. In 2012, the blog The Truth About Syria also identified Farhood as the author and singer of Yalla Erhal Ya Bashar!

Musical appreciation 
In February 2012, Malek Jandali, a pianist of Syrian origin, released a musical work based on the melody of Yalla Erhal Ya Bashar! and named it "Freedom (Qashoush Symphony)".

External links 

 James Harkin: The incredible story behind the Syrian protest singer everyone thought was dead (GQ Magazine, December 7, 2016, accessed on December 9, 2016)
 Anthony Shadid: Lyrical Message for Syrian Leader: "Come on, Bashar, leave!" in: New York Times from July 21, 2011

References 

1977 births
2011 deaths
People of the Syrian civil war
Syrian torture victims
People from Hama